Manu Louis is a Belgian musician, singer-songwriter, and composer, influenced equally by pop, jazz, 8-bit electronica, and 20th-century classical music.

Career 
In 2017 he released his debut album, Kermesse Machine, on Igloo Records. The album is a mix of found sounds, instrumentation, and vocal samples that are influenced by pop, classical, experimental music and jazz. The album artwork was made by Welsh photographer Jason Evans.

The tour following the release saw Louis performing solo more than 150 times in 22 different European countries, as well as China and Japan,.

Studies 
Louis studied composition at the Royal Conservatory of Liège with American composer Frederic Rzewski

Discography

LP 
 Cream Parade – Igloo Records (2019)
 Kermesse Machine – Igloo Records (2017)

Single 
 Cream Parade Remixes (12" maxi) – Le Pacifique Records/Igloo Records (2020)
 Coltan Major Harmonics (7") – Igloo Circle (2019)
 Tchouang Tseu (7") – New Pangea (2015)

References

External links 
 

Royal Conservatory of Liège alumni
Art rock musicians
Belgian electronic musicians
Year of birth missing (living people)
Living people
Experimental pop musicians
21st-century Belgian male singers
21st-century Belgian singers
Igloo Records artists